Phoa Tjoen Hoay (1890–1966), who sometimes published as T. H. Phoa Jr., was a Chinese Indonesian, Malay language journalist, translator, and newspaper editor active in the Dutch East Indies in the early twentieth century. He translated a number of Chinese and European works into Malay, including seven volumes of Sherlock Holmes by Arthur Conan Doyle.

Biography
Phoa Tjoen Hoay was born in Buitenzorg, Buitenzorg Residency, Dutch East Indies (today Bogor, Indonesia) in 1890. He came from an elite Peranakan Chinese family in Buitenzorg; his father was a Kapitan Cina (Dutch-appointed Chinese community representative) and his older brother Phoa Tjoen Hoat also became a journalist. Little is known about Phoa's early life or education, although he seems to have had a European education and could read and write in Dutch, English, and French and possibly written Chinese, as well as Malay.

He began working as a translator in around 1904, translating Chinese detective novels into Malay. Over the next two decades he translated a number of other works from Chinese, French and English into Malay, including seven volumes of Sherlock Holmes printed in 1914, and English and German adventure novels by writers such as H. Rider Haggard.

He seems to have become a journalist around 1909, at the start of a huge boom in new Malay-language newspapers and a growth of readership due to the expansion of literacy among the non-European population. He became editor of the short-lived Malay edition of a Chinese magazine in Batavia called . By 1911 he had relocated to Semarang in Central Java and became editor of the daily newspaper Warna Warta. That same year, he was summoned before the public prosecutor in Batavia for an article he had printed in  the year before. In the piece, he had stated that young Chinese in the Indies should go to school to learn Chinese, and then English, a world language, rather than learn Dutch, a language only spoken in a small corner of the world. He also thought that the push to build Dutch-language schools for Chinese children (Hollandsch Chineesche School) was part of an intentional campaign to turn the Chinese community away from Chinese nationalism. He was charged with sedition and subversion of authority, and causing hatred between Dutch and Chinese, he was given an extremely harsh punishment of six months of forced labour. Public opinion was shocked by this heavy sentence, and petitions were sent to the Governor-general of the Dutch East Indies; but the sentence was upheld, although he ended up serving part of his sentence in prison rather than at hard labour. In 1912, while still serving his sentence, he was caught by guards with some newspapers in his possession. He was sentence to 8 days of solitary confinement and three months without any visitors.

After his release in 1912 he became the editor of a weekly publication in Batavia called . In 1915 he became editor-in-chief at Sinar Sumatra in Padang, a role he apparently held remotely and which he retained on and off until the late 1920s. In 1916 he became editor at Perniagaan, which his brother had edited previously. In 1917 he became editor of two publications printed in Pekalongan in Central Java; one was a daily called  and the other was a weekly called . He continued to publish translations and work as a journalist in the 1920s; in 1926 he was director of the Asia Press Bureau in Batavia.

After the 1920s it is unclear what he did. He died on 16 October 1966 in Bogor, Indonesia.

Selected works
  (1911, 2 volumes apparently translated from a European language)
  ( 1910)

References

1890 births
1966 deaths
Journalists from the Dutch East Indies
Malay-language writers
Newspaper editors from the Dutch East Indies
Magazine editors
People from Bogor
Indonesian people of Chinese descent